Brush Creek Township, Ohio, may refer to:
Brush Creek Township, Adams County, Ohio
Brush Creek Township, Jefferson County, Ohio
Brush Creek Township, Muskingum County, Ohio
Brush Creek Township, Scioto County, Ohio

See also
 Brushcreek Township, Highland County, Ohio

Ohio township disambiguation pages